The Brisbane Valley Rail Trail (BVRT) is a  recreation trail from Wulkuraka to Yarraman in Queensland, Australia. The trail follows the old Brisbane Valley railway line and is open to walkers, touring cyclists and horse riders.  The trail details the history and landscape of the Brisbane Valley.  It is the longest rail trail in Queensland.

Route

The top end of the trail is located in Yarraman on Australia's Great Dividing Range – north-west of Brisbane and directly west of the Sunshine Coast. The Yarraman to Moore section of the trail includes Blackbutt, Benarkin and Linville and is located in the upper reaches of the Brisbane River valley and crosses the Blackbutt Range. Benarkin and Blackbutt are located on the D’Aguilar Highway, and are also convenient access points to the Bicentennial National Trail.

Construction of the missing link between the trailheads at Moore and Toogoolawah began construction in late 2017, and was officially opened in August 2018. Prior to this, a deviation via local roads was used as a connecting route between the two former trailheads.

The bottom end of the trail is located at Wulkuraka Station in Ipswich. The Wulkuraka Station to Toogoolawah section includes Fernvale, Lowood, Coominya and Esk.

The new concrete pavement section from Wulkuraka Station to Diamantina Bld in Ipswich is Stage 4 of the Ipswich City Council Brassall Bikeway.

Use
The Department of Transport and Main Roads is the state agency responsible for the day-to-day management and maintenance of the Brisbane Valley Rail Trail in conjunction with Ipswich City, Somerset, South Burnett and Toowoomba Regional Councils, and the Ambassadors of the BVRT.  The Ambassadors of the Brisbane Valley Rail Trail – Moore Linville Benarkin Blackbutt are a small group of volunteers established in partnership with Brisbane Valley Rail Trails.  Their website should be consulted for current trail conditions/closures.

The trail is for walking, cycling and horse riding only. The surface is not suitable for road/racing bicycles, personal mobility vehicles or horse-drawn vehicles. Motorised vehicles of any type are prohibited. 

The trail surface between Moore and Yarraman is compact gravel with concrete causeways. The section from Linville to Benarkin is rough gravel with some rocky sections. The trail from Benarkin to Blackbutt features a compact gravel road. There are gradually rising grades up the range to Blackbutt.

The track from Diamantina Bld to Toogoolawah is a mostly gravel track with several unbridged creek crossings.

The section from Fernvale to Lowood is home to the annual Rail Trail Fun Run and has an excellent degraded granite surface and is most suitable for families with children looking for a short excursion.

History 
The 20th anniversary of the construction of the first section of the Brisbane Valley Rail Trail from Fernvale to Lowood was celebrated in July 2022.

Prior to 2018, there remained one incomplete section from Toogoolawah to Moore, which was officially opened in August 2018.

The Lockyer Creek Railway Bridge at Clarendon was opened to users in late 2018, after a restoration costing $4.5 million.

Wildlife
A great variety of wildlife can be seen in blackbutt and ironbark forests, hoop pine plantations, dense vine scrub, open woodlands and rural landscapes of Benarkin State Forest and the upper reaches of the Brisbane River. Three signature features of the Moore to Blackbutt district are the upper reaches of the Brisbane River, the pine forests and the colonies of bellbirds that are found there. Clear melodic notes of bellbirds can be heard in various locations within the Brisbane Valley Rail Trail. All plants, animals, natural and cultural features of the Brisbane Valley Rail Trail and the Benarkin State Forest are protected. Do not remove living or dead plant material (including fallen timber), animals, rocks or other material.

Plants
In the Benarkin State Forest section of the trail, impressive hoop pine plantations grow next to native eucalypt forests, woodlands and rainforest communities. The Benarkin State produces timber, but also provides the habitats of many plants and animals.

Tall open forests of blackbutt, tallowwood, stringybark and great gum grow on volcanic soils on higher slopes in Benarkin State Forest. Elsewhere several species of ironbark dominate the forest including silver-leaved ironbark in open woodland. Blue gums (forest red gums) are common at lower elevations. Vine scrub with a thick prickly understory occurs here and there, sometimes under tall eucalypt trees. In places, hoop pine and other tall rainforest trees rise above the canopy.

Animals
Vine scrub along the trail hosts many animals. Green catbirds, paradise riflebirds and noisy pitta are species of significance locally. Patches of grass adjacent to rainforest are visited at night by red-necked pademelons. Rufous bettongs also emerge from their grassy nests to feed on tubers and fungi at night. Dense vine scrub and thickets of lantana make some sections of the trail an important habitat for the shy and vulnerable black-breasted button-quail. Dish-shaped scrapes in the dirt are tell-tale signs that these secretive birds have been searching for food on the forest floor. Ducks, darters and other waterbirds may visit the Brisbane River that runs adjacent to the trail between Moore and Linville. There are often sightings of wedge tail eagles and brown goshawks gliding on the wind searching for their prey in the rural landscapes below. Glossy black cockatoos, brush, regent bowerbirds and the sulphur-crested cockatoos. On the hills adjacent to Blackbutt Creek and in the Benarkin State Forest, you may see the descendants of deer given to the region in 1873 by Queen Victoria as a gift after Queensland was named in her honour. Pretty faced or whip tail wallabies are often seen at dusk in and around Blackbutt and Benarkin.
Numerous frogs, skinks and lizards live in the area, including the vulnerable and secretive collared delma (a small legless lizard). There are often sightings of yellow face whip snakes, spotted pythons, goannas, and water dragons near Benarkin and Blackbutt Creek.

Heritage listings 
Lockyer Creek Railway Bridge at Clarendon was listed on the Queensland Heritage Register on 21 October 1992.  

Yimbun Railway Tunnel was listed on the Queensland Heritage Register on 27 November 2008.

References

External links 

 Official Brisbane Valley Rail Trail Website
 Brisbane Valley Interactive Rail Trail Map
 Download Brochure Map

Hiking and bushwalking tracks in Queensland
Brisbane Valley railway line
Somerset Region
Rail trails in Australia
Closed railway lines in Queensland
Rail trail bridges